The Treaty of Hampton Court (also known as the Treaty of Richmond) was signed on 22 September 1562 between Queen Elizabeth and Huguenot leader Louis I de Bourbon, prince de Condé. The treaty was concluded by François de Beauvais, Seigneur de Briquemault. Based on the terms of the accord, 3000 English troops were summoned to occupy Le Havre and Dieppe. Moreover, Queen Elizabeth promised to provide economic aid to the Huguenots. Once peace was restored in France, Elizabeth refused to withdraw her troops, stating that she had taken Le Havre not for religious reasons but to indemnify her for the loss of Calais, which was rightfully hers. The regent of France, Catherine de' Medici sent both Catholic and Huguenot troops against Le Havre, which surrendered on 28 July 1563. Feeling betrayed by the Huguenots, Elizabeth never trusted them again. This is evident when in 1572, Catherine de Medici ordered the killing of the Protestant Coligny.  This resulted in 3000 Protestants being killed in what is known as the Massacre of St Bartholomew's Day.  Elizabeth was urged to send support to the French Huguenots but refused.

Motivation
The English Secretary of State, William Cecil was concerned with safeguarding the Protestant cause in Europe, fearing a Catholic alliance of France and Spain if the powerful Guise family gained an upper hand in the French Wars of Religion. Elizabeth I shared her advisor's concern for England's fragile Protestantism, but she was more concerned with the possibility of recovering Calais (lost by Mary I in 1558) which might have occurred had the Huguenots triumphed.

See also
List of treaties

References

Sources

Knecht, R. J. Catherine de' Medici. London and New York: Longman, 1998. 

1562 in England
1562 in France
1562 in law
1562 treaties
Elizabethan era
Hampton Court Palace
History of the London Borough of Richmond upon Thames
Political history of Middlesex
Hampton Court (1562)
Hampton Court (1562)